The 1990 Tulsa Golden Hurricane football team represented the University of Tulsa as an independent during the 1990 NCAA Division I-A football season. In their third year under head coach David Rader, the Golden Hurricane compiled a 3–8 record. The team's statistical leaders included quarterback Gus Frerotte with 1,066 passing yards, Chris Hughley with 700 rushing yards, and Frank Cassano with 464 receiving yards.

Schedule

Roster

References

Tulsa
Tulsa Golden Hurricane football seasons
Tulsa Golden Hurricane football